Gotland Ring is the first sustainable racetrack and driver training venue in the world. The premium racetrack and multi-functional motorsport facility in Kappelshamn on the Swedish island of Gotland, the most popular tourist resort in Sweden, is located in an eco-municipality.

The circuit, designed by the founder and social and environmental entrepreneur Alec Arho Havrén, was FIA-inspected for racing in June 2009. However, corporate edutainment and testing is the main focus even in the future. In its final format - with a main circuit profile of 28 km - Gotland Ring will become the longest racetrack in the world.

International automotive industry new model launches have been organised on Gotland Ring since 2007. Gotland Ring is considered the only sustainable race & test track in the world – hence the choice of a Pan-European launch of the hydrogen driven Honda FCX in June 2007.  During October-Nov 2007, BMW premiered its new Efficient Dynamics technology in conjunction to its 135i Coupe introduction on Gotland Ring.

In the future, six separate circuits - totalling 28 km - will allow flexible utilisation of the facility; simultaneous testing and corporate events can be executed on different parts of the extensive complex. Circuit experts and racing champions already consider the now existing operational Gotland Ring profile as one of the most demanding and exciting in the world.

As of today, the tarmac extends over 3.2 km on the Northern Loop and it will be FIA graded and ready to be raced on by spring 2009. Modern FIA steel barriers are in place around the complete circuit and the track was certified for racing June 2009.

The second complete entity – the Southern Loop – is under pre-construction development and is ready for tarmac installation during 2015. The vast areas available for Gotland Ring, enable a complete edutainment park, green business campus, and motorsport & leisure centre for future expansion. In its final format (after 2017), the entire track system of approximately 28 km is planned to extend over an approximate 200 ha area. A green business campus, eMobility centre, and an eco resort is being planned in conjunction the Gotland Ring.

Founder and main partner - Alec Arho Havrén - is the track profile architect and driving force behind the green business campus development and a paradigm shifting Smart Energy Road and Traffic System, an energy harvesting smart micro grid with inductive wireless and mobile charging for EVs.
   
Nordkalk – the biggest limestone producer in Northern Europe - is the main sponsor and the enabling partner of Gotland Ring.

Gotland Ring functionality overview
Gotland Ring – Operational Profile

Length: 	3.2 km, dividable into two separate profiles 
Elevation: 	25 m
Topography: 	forest, limestone formations along coastal region, limestone quarry area
Width: 	        12–21 m
Corners: 	7 right and 6 left
Location: 	The Island of Gotland, an eco region (most popular tourist attraction in Sweden)

Current operational activities

•	Product launches for the automotive-, motorcycle, and related industries
•	Edutainment events – Safety Driving, Eco Driving, Racing Experience, Business Grand Prix,
•	Automotive industry testing activities
•	Smart Energy Road and Traffic System (SERTS) development
•	EV test centre (electricity 100% wind power)
•	Exclusive film shoots
•	Environmental training
•	Track days	
•	Racing Academy
•	Spectator events

Gotland Ring track profile(s) to be built 2010-2011

Three (3) circuit profiles and two (2) separate international standard circuits (tarmac extending 3.2 km currently operative + 4.2 km to be built 2021) can be run simultaneously

Length: 	7400 m (complete Grand Prix profile)
Elevation: 	25 m
Topography: 	forest, limestone formations along coastal region, limestone quarry area
Width: 	        12–25 m
Corners: 	14 left and 14 right

Development phases 2008-2019

- Installation of FIA-barriers on the 3.2 km Northern Loop (completed)
- Installation of FIA-fencing (April 2009)
- Safety & Eco Driving Centre (completed)
- Off-road tracks and trails (completed)
- Rally special stages, gravel road network (completed)
- Enduro tracks and trails (completed)
- Smart Energy Road and Traffic System (ongoing development, feasibility study completed)
- Circuit expansion: the 4.2 km Southern Loop, multipurpose race & test circuit – a total of 7.4km (2021)
- Eco Resort (2023)
- Conference & Convention Centre (2022)
- Green Business Incubator and Technology park (2023)
- Technology park for the research and development of wireless applications 
- Training and research-and-development center for traffic safety
- Testing and product development center for mission-specific, zero- and low-emission vehicles
- Green Business Incubator and mobile laboratories
- Karting circuit (2023)
- Multipurpose Race & Test Circuit network, a total of 28 km; km with six (6) major separate circuits that can be utilized simultaneously (2028)
- Aqua Adventure Park (2023)
- Airfield for ecological new technology sports planes (2023)
- Theme Hotel (2023)
- Family Theme Park – Gotland Ring Speed World (2025)

External links
Gotland Ring website 

Motorsport venues in Sweden
Sport in Gotland County
Buildings and structures in Gotland County
Tourist attractions in Gotland County